For the Princes of the West Bank (Yia Tous Prinkipes Tis Dytikis Ochthis) was Pyx Lax’s fourth studio album, released in 1994 on the Harvest label by Minos-EMI. It was recorded from June 1993 to March 1994 at the studio “IN”, Agia Paraskevi, Athens. The album is dedicated to “all those who always were satisfied with less, and whose dignity prevented them from ‘begging’ for more. For the real princes of the ‘West Bank’."

The album features a number of guest artists. The recording of "Anites Agapes" was a collaboration with the song's creators Haris and Panos Katsimihas (the Katsimihas Brothers), who share the lead vocals on that track with Babis Stokas. On "Psichalizi sto Veligradi", a recitation in Serbian with a musical backdrop, Pyx Lax collaborated with the Serbian artist Bajaga. The music was composed by another Serb, Saša Dragić, who also wrote the music for "Ti Ine Afto Pou Mas Chorizi?". Finally, the lead vocals on "Mia Zoi Sto Risko" are by the guest singer Sotiria Leonardou, and Giorgos Stathos plays clarinet on “Lene Gia Mena”.

Track listing 
"Title" (Translation) Composer/Lyricist – Track length

”San Psema“ (Like a lie) Filippos Pliatsikas — 3:25
”Anoites Agapes“ (Senseless loves) Charis & Panos Katsimichas — 4:26
”Lene Gia Mena“ (They say about me) Filippos Pliatsikas, Manos Xydous, Babis Stokas/Manos Xydous — 4:02
”S' Olous Dinese“ (You give yourself to everyone) Babis Stokas/Manos Xydous — 4:25
”De Tha Dakryso Pia Gia Sena“ (I’ll weep for you no more) Filippos Pliatsikas/Manos Xydous — 3:58
”Mia Zoi Sto Risko [O Paradisos ine topos gia defterous rolous]“ (A life on the edge [Paradise is a place for secondary roles]) Babis Stokas, Filippos Pliatsikas/Manos Xydous — 3:50
”Bori“ (Perhaps) Manos Xydous — 3:31
”Ti Ine Afto Pou Mas Chorizi?“ (What is it keeps us apart) Saša Dragić/Filippos Pliatsikas — 3:20
”Ateliota Taxidia“ (Endless journeys) Babis Stokas/Manos Xydous — 4:29
”As Gini Oti Thes“ (Let whatever you want happen) Filippos Pliatsikas/Nikos Pipinelis — 3:38
”Choris Dropi“ (Without shame) Filippos Pliatsikas/Elena Arvaniti — 3:51
”Archises na xethoriazis san mia palia fotografia“ (You’ve begun to fade like an old photograph) Manos Xydous — 5:10
”Psichalizi sto Veligradi“ (It’s drizzling in Belgrade) Saša Dragić/Bajaga — 3:37
”Ximeroma“ (Dawn) Akis Daoutis, Nikos Pipinelis — 3:09 [Instrumental]
”De Tha Dakryso Pia Gia Sena“ (I’ll weep for you no more) Filippos Pliatsikas/Manos Xydous — 5:24

Interviews and Quotes 

Filippos Pliatsikas elaborated on the  - formerly mentioned - dedication in interviews. In response to one interviewer’s  observation that “there is another categorisation which concerns you: the west bank”, Pliatsikas responded:
That began with our record The Princes of the West Bank. We are from the west of Athens and have lived with these ordinary people (such were our parents and our neighbours) who would get up at 6 in the morning and yet have the heart, returning from work, to get together, drink their coffees, and chat. We dedicated the disc to all of these people we marvel at, wherever they are. Since then the idea that we are supporters of western Athens stuck, but other than through our songs, we do not have the means to support anything.

In another interview he said:
In 1994 we released the record For the Princes of the West Bank dedicated to the people of western Athens, where we lived—people who laboured and were wage earners, and whom we saw as princes because they returned to their homes [from work] and had the heart to smile. They kept up their friendships and were civil to one another. That’s how we got stuck with the title “princes of the west bank”.

Personnel 

All tracks arranged by Filippos Pliatsikas, Manos Govatzidakis, Bambis Stokas, Akis Daoutis, Dimitra Karaberopoulou, and Manos Xydous, except for track 2 (arranged by Panos Katsimihas, and tracks 8 and 13 (arranged by Filippos Pliatsikas, Akis Daoutis, Saša Dragić, Bayaka, and Bambis Stokas.

 Akis Bogiatzis – bass
 Akis Daoutis – electric guitar, 12-string guitar, bass, keyboards
 Alkis Papadopoulos – keyboards
 Babis Stokas – lead vocals, percussion, acoustic guitar
 Bayaka – recitation on "Psihalizei sto Veligardi", acoustic guitar
 Dimitra Karamberopoulou – accordion, piano, keyboards
 Filippos Pliatsikas – vocals, keyboards, guitars, piano, Baglamas
 Giorgos Stathos (Clarinet on "Lene Yia Mena”
 Haris Katsimihas (vocals on "Anoites Agapes”
 Johnny Papadopoulos – Dubek, percussion
 Konstantinos Zoulas – bass
 Kostakis Vouros – 12-string guitar, Tzouras
 Louis Karakatsis – Baglamas
 Manos Govatzidakis – percussion, keyboards, programming
 Manos Xydous – vocals, Acoustic guitar, bass, percussion. lead vocals on "As Ginei O,ti Thes"
 Minos Matsas (Oud on "Mporei”
 Nikos Panagiotatos – Electric guitar, Mandolin
 Nikos Pipinelis – acoustic and electric guitar on "Something Like a Baglamas"
 Panos Katsimihas – vocals on "Anoites Agapes", Harmonica, Tambourine, percussion
 Saša Dragić – acoustic guitar
 Sotiria Leonardou – lead vocals on "Mia Zoi Sto Risko”
 Tasos Psalidakis – keyboards, percussion
 Vangelis Efstathiou – percussion
 Xavier Padilla – bass
 Sound engineer: Manos Govatzidakis
 Remix: Manos Govatzidakis
 production: Minos-EMI
 Head of production: Manos Xydous
 Co-ordination: Maria Parousi

References

1994 albums
Pyx Lax albums